Mogoșești may refer to several places in Romania:

Mogoșești, a commune in Iași County
Mogoșești-Siret, a commune in Iași County
Mogoșești, a village in Vedea Commune, Argeș County
Mogoșești, a village in Dragomirești Commune, Dâmbovița County
Mogoșești, a village in Goiești Commune, Dolj County
Mogoșești, a village in Adunații-Copăceni Commune, Giurgiu County
Mogoșești, a village in Satulung Commune, Maramureș County
Mogoșești, a village administered by Scornicești town, Olt County
Mogoșești, a village in Stoenești Commune, Vâlcea County
Mogoșești, the Romanian name for Bairaky Commune, Hertsa Raion, Ukraine

See also 
 Mogoș
 Mogoșani
 Mogoșoaia (disambiguation)